The 2022 Rhythmic Gymnastics World Championships was held from 14 to 18 September 2022 in Sofia, Bulgaria.

Participating countries

Schedule
 Wednesday, September 14
 09:30 - 19:10 Individual Qualification - Hoop and Ball
 20:20 - 21:00 Opening Ceremony
 21:00 - 21:35 Individual Hoop Final
 21:42 - 22:17 Individual Ball Final
 Thursday, September 15 
 09:30 - 19:16 Individual Qualification - Clubs and Ribbon
 21:00 - 21:35 Individual Clubs Final
 21:42 - 22:17 Individual Ribbon Final
 Friday, September 16 
 14:30 - 18:55 Group All Around
 Saturday, September 17 
 14:45 - 19:31 Individual All Around Final 
 Sunday, September 18 
 15:00 - 15:43 Group 5 Hoops Final
 15:48 - 16:31 Group 3 Ribbons + 2 Balls Final
 17:15 - 18:00 Closing Ceremony

Medal summary

* reserve gymnast

Individual

Individual Qualification 

 The top 8 scores in individual apparatus qualify to the apparatus finals and the top 18 in overall qualification scores advance to the all-around final.

All-Around

Hoop
Source:

Ball
Source:

Clubs

Ribbon

Groups

Squads

All-Around
The top 8 scores in the apparatus qualifies to the group apparatus finals.

5 Hoops

3 Ribbons + 2 Balls

Team

Combined Team Ranking

Olympic quotas 

The top three groups in the group all-around earned group quotas for the 2024 Olympic Games.

Medal table

References

External links
 

Rhythmic Gymnastics World Championships
Rhythmic Gymnastics World Championships
Rhythmic Gymnastics
Gymnastics Championships
Sports competitions in Sofia
Gymnastics in Bulgaria
Rhythmic Gymnastics World Championships